Roman Ildonzo Gabriel Jr. (born August 5, 1940) is an American former professional football player who was a quarterback in the National Football League (NFL). He was the second overall pick in the 1962 NFL Draft and played for the Los Angeles Rams for eleven seasons, then five seasons for the Philadelphia Eagles. He is notable for being the first NFL quarterback of Filipino-American descent.

Early years
Gabriel was born to Edna Mae Wyatt and Roman Ildonzo Gabriel Sr., a Filipino immigrant, in Wilmington, North Carolina. Gabriel grew up poor and suffered from asthma, but he played high school football at New Hanover High School and graduated in 1958. He went on to star at quarterback at North Carolina State University in Raleigh.

A two-time All-American and two-time ACC Player of the Year (1960–61), Gabriel finished his college career holding virtually every Wolfpack passing record.  An academic All-American, Gabriel saw his jersey retired after his senior season and then presented to him by North Carolina governor Terry Sanford on January 20, 1962, at halftime of an NC State-Maryland basketball game in Reynolds Coliseum. As captain of his team, Gabriel set 22 school and nine conference football records. He threw for 2,961 yards and 19 touchdowns.

Known for his arm strength, he also played baseball and was voted the best amateur athlete in the Carolinas. In a three-year career, he passed for 20 touchdowns and ran for 15. The Atlantic Coast Conference's 50th Anniversary Football Team was announced in 2003 and Gabriel was among the top 50 players in the history of the ACC to be listed. Gabriel was inducted into the College Football Hall of Fame in 1989.

Professional career
Gabriel was the number one 1962 AFL Draft pick, chosen by the Oakland Raiders, and was the number 2 1962 NFL Draft pick, selected by the Los Angeles Rams. Gabriel signed with the Rams and went on to a distinguished professional career.

NFL career
Gabriel wore the number 18 with the Rams and the number 5 with the Eagles. In the professional ranks, Gabriel went on to play 16 seasons in the NFL, splitting time with the Los Angeles Rams (1962–72) and the Philadelphia Eagles (1973–77). He was awarded the NFL Most Valuable Player Award in 1969 and earned Pro Bowl spots in 1967, 1968, 1969, and 1973. When he retired, he ranked as the Rams' all-time passing leader with 22,223 yards and 154 touchdowns (1,705 com./3,313 att.) and threw for 7,221 yards and 45 touchdowns (661 com./1,185 att.) with the Eagles. In 1973, he led the NFL with 3,219 yards and 23 touchdown passes, for which he was awarded the NFL Comeback Player of the Year Award. As of the end of the 2016 NFL season, he still holds the Rams' career records for touchdown passes (154), passes attempted (3,313), and wins by a starting quarterback (74).

From 1962 through 1965, Gabriel had a difficult time securing a starting quarterback job. Ram coaches gave Zeke Bratkowski or Bill Munson the nod over Gabriel. However, due to other quarterbacks slumping or being injured, Gabriel did get to start 23 games from 1962 through 1965. The team's record in those games was 11–11–1. Although his record as a starter was average, the other Rams quarterbacks who started the other 33 games combined record was 4–27–2. Gabriel's significant wins include a 1965 victory to beat the eventual NFL champion Green Bay Packers and the 11–3 Cleveland Browns.

When George Allen took over for Harland Svare to coach the Rams in 1966, one of his first moves was to make Gabriel the primary starter. Gabriel started all fourteen games and the Rams went 8–6, their first winning season since 1958. In 1967 the Rams went 11–1–2 and made the playoffs as NFL Coastal Division champions. Gabriel was named the AP Offensive Player of the Week the last two weeks of the season. In week 13, needing a win to keep their playoff hopes alive, Gabriel was 20-for-36 with three touchdowns (including the game-winner in the last minute) in a 27–24 come from behind win over the defending champion Green Bay Packers. The next week, in a game against the Baltimore Colts that would decide the division title, Gabriel completed 18-of-22 passes with three touchdowns as the Rams won 34–10. The 1967 Rams finished as the highest-scoring team in the NFL but were eliminated from the playoffs by the Packers 28–7. Gabriel threw for 2,779 yards and 25 touchdowns and was a second-team All-Pro and a Pro Bowler.

The following season they were in another neck and neck battle for the Coastal Division title with the Colts. Going into the thirteenth game of the season, the Rams needed a win to stay within one-half game of the Colts, who would be coming to Los Angeles the following week for the season finale. However, the Rams took a 17–16 loss to the Chicago Bears and soon finished in second place.

In 1969, the Rams opened the season with an eleven-game winning streak (still a team record), before suffering their first loss to the 10–1 Minnesota Vikings in Los Angeles by a score of 20–13. With the division clinched and the undefeated record gone, coach Allen decided to rest many of his starters and the Rams lost their last two games to finish 11–3. In a rematch with the Vikings in the playoffs in Minnesota, the Rams lost, 23–20. For the season, Gabriel threw 24 touchdowns and only seven interceptions and was named the NFL's Most Valuable Player by the AP and NEA, the Player of the Year by the UPI and was voted All-Pro and to the Pro Bowl.

In 1970, the league realigned, putting the Rams in contention with the San Francisco 49ers for the new NFC West Division title. After an upset loss at home to the lowly New York Jets (who were without the injured Joe Namath) in which Gabriel threw three interceptions, the Rams won three straight games, including a crucial 30–13 win over the 49ers to take over first place. Going into the thirteenth week of the season, the Rams participated in the first Monday Night Football game in the city of Los Angeles. However, despite over 300 yards passing from Gabriel, the Rams lost 28–23 to the Detroit Lions, putting the Rams back in 2nd place and left them a half-game behind the Lions for the wild card playoff spot. The Rams won their finale at the New York Giants 31–3 (eliminating the Giants from playoff contention) but failed to make the playoffs as the Lions won to secure the wild card spot, and the 49ers won to clinch the NFC Western Division title. From 1967 to 1970, Gabriel led the Rams to a 41–14–4 overall record and was named to three Pro Bowls during that four-year span.

In 1971, the veteran Rams began to show their age and Gabriel missed parts of every game due to knee and shoulder injuries. In addition, coach George Allen left for the Redskins after a long-running dispute with general manager Dan Reeves. Still, the Rams, despite playing the league's toughest schedule, faced almost the same situation as in 1970. After falling behind the 49ers in the seventh week of the season, they rallied back to take the division lead going into another matchup in Los Angeles on Monday night for the thirteenth week of the season, for which the matchup was against Washington (now coached by Allen). After falling behind 31–10, Gabriel led the Rams back to within 31–24 and was driving to a possible tying score when he was intercepted; it was returned for a touchdown and the Redskins won. Once again, the Rams fell into second place behind the 49ers and behind the Redskins for the wild card berth. Despite winning in Pittsburgh in the final week of the year, the 49ers came from behind to beat the Lions, 31–27, and win the division.

In 1972, Gabriel's knee and shoulder injury problems deteriorated. After making 89 consecutive starts over eight seasons, he missed two games and lost playing time in all twelve other games. Still, after a Monday night win in San Francisco in the twelfth week, the Rams regained first place. But losses to the Cardinals and Lions in the final two weeks (combined with a previous loss to the woeful Saints), doomed their season. The Rams finished 6–7–1 and coach Tommy Prothro was fired.

After the 1972 season, the Rams hired Chuck Knox as their new coach and obtained John Hadl to be the quarterback. After he threatened to accept a $100,000 contract with the Las Vegas Casinos of the Southwestern Football League in April 1973, Gabriel was traded from the Rams to the Philadelphia Eagles for Harold Jackson, Tony Baker, a 1974 first-round selection (11th overall–John Cappelletti) and first- and third-round picks in 1975 (11th and 67th overall–Dennis Harrah and Dan Nugent) on June 8, 1973.

Gabriel improved a 2–11–1 Eagles team to a 5–8–1 record. Gabriel was voted to the Pro Bowl for the fourth time and was voted the "Comeback Player of the Year" by Pro Football Weekly. For the 1973 season, Gabriel led the Eagles with 270 completions, 460 attempts, and 3,219 yards, and 23 touchdowns (all were league highs) as the Eagle offense was the most prolific passing game in the NFL. Gabriel played through 1977 but his final two years were in a backup role. In his last season, he backed up Ron Jaworski, who had played for the Rams from 1973 to 1976.

In his career, he had a winning record of 86–64–7 and passed for over 29,000 yards and 201 touchdowns. He is the only quarterback from his era to still rank high in the "lowest interception percentage" category in NFL passing statistics.  The Professional Football Researchers Association named Gabriel to the PFRA Hall of Very Good Class of 2013.

After his playing career, he had a brief two-year career as a member of the NFL on CBS broadcasting team from 1978 to 1979.

Coaching career
Gabriel was the last football coach at Cal Poly Pomona, where from 1980 to 1982 his teams compiled an 8–24 record. On November 26, 1982, he resigned to become offensive coordinator with the Boston Breakers of the USFL. Cal Poly-Pomona terminated its football program.

Gabriel was head coach of the Raleigh-Durham Skyhawks of the World League of American Football. He was the only coach who did not win a game in the inaugural 1991 season. The Skyhawks disbanded shortly thereafter.

Acting career
Roman Gabriel was a frequent guest on television talk shows of the era, including The Merv Griffin Show, The Virginia Graham Show, The Rosey Grier Show, and The Joey Bishop Show.

Gabriel had a brief career in movies, playing a prison guard in Otto Preminger's 1968 spoof Skidoo and a Native American named "Blue Boy" in the 1969 John Wayne and Rock Hudson film, The Undefeated. He had previously appeared as a headhunter in the November 14, 1966 "Topsy-Turvey" episode of CBS' Gilligan's Island. With several of his Rams teammates, he  made a cameo appearance as a football player in the 1965 Perry Mason episode, "The Case of the 12th Wildcat", as well as in 1970 on an Ironside episode, "Blackout". He appeared twice on Rowan & Martin's Laugh-In. He was also on a 1978 episode of Wonder Woman, "The Deadly Sting".

Career statistics

Regular season

Postseason statistics

Head coaching record

College

Awards
 1969: NFL Most Valuable Player Award, AP, UPI, NEA, and the Bert Bell MVP Trophy (Maxwell Club)
 1970: Pro Bowl MVP
 1973: NFL Comeback Player of the Year

See also
 Gunslinger
 List of most consecutive starts by a National Football League quarterback

References

External links

 

1940 births
Living people
American football quarterbacks
College football announcers
Cal Poly Pomona Broncos football coaches
Carolina Panthers announcers
Los Angeles Rams players
NC State Wolfpack football players
Philadelphia Eagles players
American Football League first overall draft picks
National Football League announcers
National Football League first-overall draft picks
NFL Europe (WLAF) coaches
California State Polytechnic University, Pomona alumni
College Football Hall of Fame inductees
National Conference Pro Bowl players
Western Conference Pro Bowl players
Sportspeople from Wilmington, North Carolina
Players of American football from North Carolina
American sportspeople of Filipino descent
New Hanover High School alumni
National Football League Most Valuable Player Award winners